The Torre Cepsa (renamed in June 2014, before was Torre Bankia)() is a skyscraper located in the Cuatro Torres Business Area in Madrid, Spain. It is the second tallest building in Spain and the 4th tallest building in the European Union.

Designed by Lord Foster, it was first known as Torre Repsol and would have served as headquarters for Repsol YPF oil and gas company. During the construction of the tower, Repsol decided to change the location of its future headquarters and the financial institution Caja Madrid purchased the building for €815 million in August 2007.

In 2016 it was bought by Amancio Ortega, Europe's richest man and founder of global fashion group and Zara owner Inditex (ITX.MC), for €490 million euros through his property investment arm, Pontegadea Inmobiliaria, one of the biggest property companies in Spain. He purchased the tower from Abu Dhabi tycoon Khadem al-Qubaisi, whose fund had exercised a last-minute purchase option from Spanish lender Bankia (BKIA.MC), its previous owner.

It was built by a joint venture of Dragados and Fomento de Construcciones y Contratas.

Gallery

See also
 List of tallest buildings in Spain
 List of tallest buildings in the European Union
 List of tallest buildings in the world
 HSBC Building (Hong Kong), Fosters first skyscraper. It was also vertically segmented.

References

External links 

 Fosters and Partners official site 
 Halvorson and Partners Structural Engineers official site 

Foster and Partners buildings
Office buildings completed in 2008
Skyscraper office buildings in Madrid
Modernist architecture in Madrid
t